ŽKK Studenac Omiš is a Croatian Women's basketball club in Omiš. The headquarters is in Omiš.

Notable players 
 Antonela Anić

External links
Profile at eurobasket.com

Women's basketball teams in Croatia